Thomas Merritt Cayley (18 August 1878 – 30 May 1933) was a Liberal party member of the House of Commons of Canada. He was born in East Oxford Township, Ontario and became an insurance agent, school principal and teacher.

Cayley attended secondary school at Norwich and normal school in London, Ontario. He was a schoolteacher for 18 years, based in Norwich five years into this career. He was principal of Norwich Continuation School for four years. He was also secretary-treasurer for Otter Mutual Insurance and Mutual Fire Underwriters of Ontario.

He was first elected to Parliament at the Oxford South riding in the 1926 general election then re-elected in 1930. Cayley died on 30 May 1933 before completing his term in the 17th Canadian Parliament.

References

External links
 

1878 births
1933 deaths
Canadian schoolteachers
Members of the House of Commons of Canada from Ontario
Liberal Party of Canada MPs